Adéfarasin is a surname  of Yoruba origin, meaning "the crown or royalty stays hidden". People with this surname include:

 Justice Adefarasin (1921-1989), Nigerian judge
 Paul Adefarasin (born 1963), Nigerian pastor and televangelist
 Remi Adefarasin (born 1948), English cinematographer